Vichugsky District is an administrative and municipal district (raion), one of the twenty-one in Ivanovo Oblast, Russia. It is located in the northern central part of the oblast. Its administrative center is the town of Vichuga (which is not administratively a part of the district). As of the 2021 Census, the total population of the district was 16,415.

Administrative and municipal status
Within the framework of administrative divisions, Vichugsky District is one of the twenty-one in the oblast. The town of Vichuga serves as its administrative center, despite being incorporated separately as an administrative unit with the status equal to that of the districts.

As a municipal division, the district is incorporated as Vichugsky Municipal District. The Town of Vichuga is incorporated separately from the district as Vichuga Urban Okrug.

References

Notes

Sources

Districts of Ivanovo Oblast
